This is a list of notable noodles. Noodles are a type of staple food made from some type of unleavened dough which is rolled flat and cut into long strips or strings. Noodles are usually cooked in boiling water, sometimes with cooking oil or salt added.  They are often pan-fried or deep-fried. Noodles are often served with an accompanying sauce or in a soup. Noodles can be refrigerated for short-term storage, or dried and stored for future use.

Noodles

 Cup Noodles
 Fideo
 Fried noodles
 Frozen noodles
 Instant noodle
 Mohnnudel
 Rice noodles
 Rice vermicelli
 Schupfnudel
 Coca noodles
 Kesme

Chinese noodles

There is a great variety of Chinese noodles, which vary according to their region of production, ingredients, shape or width, and manner of preparation. They are an important part of most regional cuisines within China, as well as in Taiwan, Singapore, and other Southeast Asian nations with sizable overseas Chinese populations.
 Biangbiang noodles
 Cellophane noodles
 Chinkiang pot cover noodles
 Cumian
 Daoxiao noodles
 Dragon beard noodles
 Henan braised noodles
 Hot dry noodles
 Jook-sing noodles
 Kaomianjin
 Lai fun
 Lamian
 Liangpi
 Migan
 Misua
 Mixian
 Mung bean sheets
 Oil noodles
 Paomo
 Rice vermicelli
 Saang mein
 Shahe fen
 Shrimp roe noodles
 Silver needle noodles
 Yi mein
 Youmian

Hong Kong
 Gong Zai Mian
 Wonton noodles

Indian
 Idiyappam
 Sevai

Filipino

 Canton – egg noodles, usually round
 Bihon – rice noodles
 Lomi – thick egg noodles
 Miki – soft yellow egg noodles, usually flat
 Misua – wheat vermicelli
 Palabok – yellow cornstarch noodles
 Sotanghon – glass noodles

Indonesian
 Bakmi
 Bihun
 Kwetiau
 Mie goreng
 Mie balap
 Mie jagung – made from corn starch.
 Mie sagu – made from sago starch.
 Mie singkong – made from cassava starch.
 Soun – made from tapioca, ganyong starch, or aren starch. Blue soun also popular with food coloring process.

Japanese

Japanese noodles are a staple part of Japanese cuisine. They are often served chilled with dipping sauces, or in soups or hot dishes.
 Hiyamugi
 Ramen
 Sanuki udon
 Shirataki noodles
 Soba
 Sōmen
 Udon
 Wanko soba
 Yakisoba

Korean
Korean noodles are noodles or noodle dishes in Korean cuisine, and are collectively referred to as guksu in native Korean or myeon (cf. mien) in Sino-Korean vocabulary.
 Cellophane noodles
 Cheonsachae
 Dotori guksu
 Garak guksu
 Jjolmyeon

Malaysian

 Char kway teow
 Kolo mee
 Mee bandung Muar
 Mee goreng
 Mee kari
 Mee Rebus
 Pan mee
 Wonton noodles

Thai
 Khanom chin
 Rice noodles

Vietnamese

See also
 List of noodle dishes
 List of noodle restaurants
 List of instant noodle brands
 List of pasta
 Momofuku Ando Instant Ramen Museum

References

External links
 
 
 
 
 
 
 
 
 
 
 
 
 

Noodles
Noodle
+Noodle